Beardsworth is an English surname. Notable people with the surname include:

 Fred Beardsworth (1899–1964), English footballer
 Reginald St John Beardsworth Battersby (1900–1977), British army officer

English-language surnames